Stan Smith was the defending champion but lost in the semifinals to John Newcombe.

Newcombe won in the final 4–6, 6–3, 6–3, 6–2 against Björn Borg.

Seeds
A champion seed is indicated in bold text while text in italics indicates the round in which that seed was eliminated.

Draw

References

External links
 1974 World Championship Tennis Finals draw

Singles